Colorado's 9th Senate district is one of 35 districts in the Colorado Senate. It has been represented by Republican Paul Lundeen since 2019, succeeding fellow Republican Kent Lambert.

Geography
District 9 covers the northern suburbs of Colorado Springs in El Paso County, including the communities of Monument, Palmer Lake, Black Forest, Gleneagle, Woodmoor, and parts of Falcon and Colorado Springs proper. The district is also home to the United States Air Force Academy.

The district is located entirely within Colorado's 5th congressional district, and overlaps with the 14th, 15th, 18th, 19th, and 20th districts of the Colorado House of Representatives.

Recent election results

2022
Colorado state senators are elected to staggered four-year terms; under normal circumstances, the 9th district holds elections in midterm years. The 2022 election will be the first held under the state's new district lines.

Historical election results

2018

2014

Federal and statewide results in District 9

References 

9
El Paso County, Colorado